Narender Negi (born 12 February 1978) is an Indian former cricketer. He played first-class cricket for Delhi and Haryana between 2001 and 2004.

See also
 List of Delhi cricketers

References

External links
 

1978 births
Living people
Indian cricketers
Delhi cricketers
Haryana cricketers
Place of birth missing (living people)